BPC Generation Infrastructure Trust is a trust established  by Ontario Municipal Employees Retirement System (OMERS) as part of the consortium to run the Bruce Nuclear Generating Station in Ontario. The trust owns 31.2% of Bruce Power, following the sale by British Energy of its share in 2003.

References

Companies based in Ontario
OMERS companies
Investment funds